Sumika (stylized as sumika) is a Japanese rock band from Kawasaki, Kanagawa. The band formed as an indie rock band in 2013, before being signed to a major label in 2018. The band is also known as Sumika [camp session] during live performances, which are known for including performances by non-musicians such as filmmakers, photographers, painters, sculptors, architects, potters, and poets. The band's music has also been featured in the anime series Wotakoi: Love is Hard for Otaku, Mix: Meisei Story, Pretty Boy Detective Club, and the anime film I Want to Eat Your Pancreas, My Hero Academia. The band is affiliated with Sony Music Entertainment Japan.

History
Sumika was formed in Kawasaki, Kanagawa, in May 2013. The group's name is derived from the Japanese word , and refers to the desire of its members to consider the band as their "house" or their "room". The original members were Kenta Kataoka, Junnosuke Kuroda, and Tomoyuki Arai. Takayuki Ogawa, who had previously performed with the group as a guest member, joined the group full-time in 2015.

Sumika debuted in 2013 with the release of their first mini-album  in October of that year. Their second mini-album I Co Y was released in November 2014 and peaked at number 59 on the Oricon weekly charts. Their third mini-album Vital Apartment was released in June 2015 and peaked at number 32 on the Oricon weekly charts. In 2016, they released the single , the mini-album , and the extended play "Sally". In 2017, they released their first full-length album Familia, which peaked at number 5 on the Oricon weekly charts and charted for 41 weeks.

Sumika became affiliated with Sony Music Entertainment Japan in 2018. That same year, they released the extended play "Fiction"; the title track was used as the opening theme to the anime television series Wotakoi: Love is Hard for Otaku. This was followed by the release of the single  in August; The release's two songs were used in the anime film I Want to Eat Your Pancreas, and the band's members also made voice acting appearances in the film.

On February 24, 2023, it was announced that guitarist Junnosuke Kuroda died the day prior, at the age of 34.

Members
Current members
 — lead vocals, guitarist
 — drummer
 — keyboardist, chorus vocals

Past members
 — guitarist, chorus vocals

Discography

Independent releases

Singles

Albums

Major releases

Singles

DVDs

References

External links
  
 
 
 

Anime musical groups
Japanese rock music groups
Musical groups established in 2013
Musical groups from Kanagawa Prefecture
Sony Music Entertainment Japan artists
2013 establishments in Japan